Richard Pace was a Georgian builder and architect in Lechlade, Gloucestershire, England. He served in the Life Guards 1784-88. Most of his known commissions were houses, in many cases for Church of England clergy. He also restored or refitted a small number of Church of England parish churches. He is commemorated by a monument in St. Lawrence's parish churchyard, Lechlade.

Works
Soho Square, London: house, 1791 or 1794 (demolished 1937)
Bibury Club, Bibury, Gloucestershire: race stand, 1800 (since demolished)
Woodhill Park, Bushton, Wiltshire: southeast range, 1804
Manor Farm, Broadwell, Oxfordshire: house, 1804
St. Lawrence, Lechlade, Gloucestershire: Old Vicarage, 1805
Saint Mary's, Broughton, Oxfordshire: alterations to Rectory, 1808
Saint Peter's, Broughton Poggs, Oxfordshire: alterations to Old Rectory, 1808
Filkins Hall, Filkins, Oxfordshire: stables, 1809
Saint James', Coln St. Dennis, Gloucestershire: Rectory, 1810
Kingston Lisle, Oxfordshire: added wings to Kingston Lisle House, circa 1812.
Saint Andrew's, Chinnor, Oxfordshire: Rectory, 1813
Salperton Park, Salperton, Gloucestershire: country house, 1817
Saint Mary's, Shipton-under-Wychwood, Oxfordshire: Vicarage, 1818
Stone Farm, Sherborne, Gloucestershire: house, 1818
Lodge at Black Horse Ridge, Birdlip, Gloucestershire, 1822
Saint Lawrence' parish church, Lechlade, Gloucestershire: repairs, refitting and galleries, 1823 (all removed 1882)
St. Nicholas, Oddington, Gloucestershire: alterations to Old Rectory, 1820
Saint Giles', Coberley, Gloucestershire: Rectory, 1826
Saint John the Baptist parish church, Burford, Oxfordshire: refitted interior 1826-27
Saint Peter's parish church, Broadwell, Oxfordshire: gallery and other fittings, 1829
Saint Matthew's parish church, Langford, Oxfordshire: restoration and new pews, 1829
Saint Nicholas', Hatherop, Gloucestershire: Rectory, 1833 (now Severalls)
Shrivenham Rectory 1805. (Shrivenham, Berks) Book 'Creating Paradise p. 230. Letter Rev Edward Berens, British Library ADD MS 73757

References

Sources

1838 deaths
18th-century English people
19th-century English architects
English ecclesiastical architects
Year of birth unknown
People from Lechlade
Architects from Gloucestershire